Sufetula chagosalis is a moth of the family Crambidae described by Thomas Bainbrigge Fletcher in 1910. It is endemic to the Chagos Archipelago in the Indian Ocean.

References

External links

Moths described in 1910
Spilomelinae